Gordon Vincent Clark (15 June 1914 – 18 October 1997) was an English professional footballer who played as a full back. He later undertook various managerial, coaching and scouting positions.

References

External links

1914 births
1997 deaths
People from Guisborough
Association football fullbacks
English footballers
English football managers
Southend United F.C. players
Manchester City F.C. players
Hyde United F.C. players
Lisburn Distillery F.C. managers
West Bromwich Albion F.C. managers
Peterborough United F.C. managers
Footballers from Yorkshire